Homebrook is a community in the Canadian province of Manitoba.

Demographics 

References

Northern communities in Manitoba